Lookout is an unincorporated community located in the town of Dover, in Buffalo County, Wisconsin, United States.

References

Unincorporated communities in Buffalo County, Wisconsin
Unincorporated communities in Wisconsin